Quick is a 2011 South Korean contemporary action comedy film.

Plot
Seoul, 2004. A group of bikers are joy-riding through the streets and while their leader the teenage Han Ki-su (Lee Min-ki) is tearfully berated by girlfriend Chun-shim (Kang Ye-won) for scorning her. The biker Kim Myung-shik (Kim In-kwon) is attracted to Chun-shim watches dolefully. Following some heavy traffic, Ki-su executes a perfect bike jump over it.

Six years later Ki-su is working as a bike messenger. After delivering a package to an office, the building blows up just after he leaves. Ki-su doesn't think his package was connected to the blast. Ki-su is later asked to drive Ah-rom, the lead vocalist of girl group OK Girls, to a televised stadium concert that she is late for. To his surprise, he finds that she is actually Chun-shim who is still angry at how she was treated years earlier. He offers her his helmet, unaware that it's been switched for an identical one rigged with an explosive. Ki-su receives a phone call and is told to deliver three packages already stowed in his bike, with a 30-minute delivery time for each package. If they exceed the time limit or if Chun-shim tries to take off the helmet then it will explode. Meanwhile, the police, led by Detective Seo (Ko Chang-seok) and NPCC team leader Kim (Ju Jin-mo) examine the CCTV tape in the building that exploded and believe that Ki-su is potentially the bomber. Ki-su delivers Chun-shim to the concert just in time where she performs in the helmet. The two of them start to make the deliveries, while being hunted by the police and trying to figure out who is responsible for the bombings while driving between Seoul and Incheon.

Cast
 Lee Min-ki - Gi-soo
 Kang Ye-won - Ah-rom
 Kim In-kwon - Myung-sik 
 Xu Fan - Detective Seo
 Yoon Je-kyoon - Eok-jo
 Song Jae-ho - Han-soo
 Kim So-jin - Team manager
 Kim Byung-chul - Detective Park
 Yoo Seung-mok - Lee Do-hyung
 Lee Hae-in - Chun-shim's alumni (cameo)

Reception
It grossed a total of over  after seven weeks of screening.

Film Business Asia gave the film a seven out of ten rating, comparing it to the action comedy films produced by Luc Besson, opining that it was an "action movie that's fast, furious and (thankfully) funny".

References

External links
  
 Quick at Naver 
 
 
 

2011 films
2011 action comedy films
South Korean action comedy films
Motorcycling films
CJ Entertainment films
2010s Korean-language films
2011 comedy films
2010s South Korean films